

Events

Pre-1600
1277 – The Byzantine–Venetian treaty of 1277 is concluded, stipulating a two-year truce and renewing Venetian commercial privileges in the Byzantine Empire.
1279 – A Mongol victory at the Battle of Yamen ends the Song dynasty in China.
1284 – The Statute of Rhuddlan incorporates the Principality of Wales into England.
1452 – Frederick III of Habsburg is the last Holy Roman Emperor crowned by medieval tradition in Rome by Pope Nicholas V.
1563 – The Edict of Amboise is signed, ending the first phase of the French Wars of Religion and granting certain freedoms to the Huguenots.

1601–1900
1649 – The House of Commons of England passes an act abolishing the House of Lords, declaring it "useless and dangerous to the people of England".
1687 – Explorer Robert Cavelier de La Salle, searching for the mouth of the Mississippi River, is murdered by his own men.
1808 – Charles IV, king of Spain, abdicates after riots and a popular revolt at the winter palace Aranjuez. His son, Ferdinand VII, takes the throne. 
1812 – The Cortes of Cádiz promulgates the Spanish Constitution of 1812.
 1824 – American explorer Benjamin Morrell departed Antarctica after a voyage later plagued by claims of fraud.
1831 – First documented bank heist in U.S. history, when burglars stole $245,000 (1831 values) from the City Bank (now Citibank) on Wall Street. Most of the money was recovered.
1853 – The Taiping Heavenly Kingdom occupies and makes Nanjing its capital until 1864.
1861 – The First Taranaki War ends in New Zealand.
1863 – The , said to have been the most powerful Confederate cruiser, is destroyed on her maiden voyage with a cargo of munitions, medicines, and merchandise then valued at over $1,000,000.
1865 – American Civil War: The Battle of Bentonville begins. By the end of the battle two days later, Confederate forces had retreated from Four Oaks, North Carolina.
1885 – Louis Riel declares a provisional government in Saskatchewan, beginning the North-West Rebellion.
1895 – Auguste and Louis Lumière record their first footage using their newly patented cinematograph.
1900 – The British archeologist Sir Arthur John Evans begins excavating Knossos Palace, the center of Cretan civilization.

1901–present
1918 – The US Congress establishes time zones and approves daylight saving time.
1920 – The United States Senate rejects the Treaty of Versailles for the second time (the first time was on November 19, 1919).
1921 – Irish War of Independence: One of the biggest engagements of the war takes place at Crossbarry, County Cork. About 100 Irish Republican Army (IRA) volunteers escape an attempt by over 1,300 British forces to encircle them.
1931 – Governor Fred B. Balzar signs a bill legalizing gambling in Nevada.
1932 – The Sydney Harbour Bridge is opened.
1943 – Frank Nitti, the Chicago Outfit Boss after Al Capone, commits suicide at the Chicago Central Railyard.
1944 – World War II: The German army occupies Hungary.
1945 – World War II: Off the coast of Japan, a dive bomber hits the aircraft carrier , killing 724 of her crew. Badly damaged, the ship is able to return to the US under her own power.
  1945   – World War II: Adolf Hitler issues his "Nero Decree" ordering all industries, military installations, shops, transportation facilities, and communications facilities in Germany to be destroyed.
1946 – French Guiana, Guadeloupe, Martinique, and Réunion become overseas départements of France.
1958 – The Monarch Underwear Company fire leaves 24 dead and 15 injured.
  1962   – The Algerian War of Independence ends.
1964 – Over 500,000 Brazilians attend the March of the Family with God for Liberty, in protest against the government of João Goulart and against communism.
1969 – The  TV-mast at Emley Moor transmitting station, United Kingdom, collapses due to ice build-up.
1979 – The United States House of Representatives begins broadcasting its day-to-day business via the cable television network C-SPAN.
1982 – Falklands War: Argentinian forces land on South Georgia Island, precipitating war with the United Kingdom.
1989 – The Egyptian flag is raised at Taba, marking the end of Israeli occupation since the Six Days War in 1967 and the Egypt–Israel peace treaty in 1979.
1990 – The ethnic clashes of Târgu Mureș begin four days after the anniversary of the Revolutions of 1848 in the Austrian Empire.
1998 – An Ariana Afghan Airlines Boeing 727 crashes on approach to Kabul International Airport, killing all 45 on board.
2001 – German trade union ver.di is formed.
2002 – Zimbabwe is suspended from the Commonwealth on charges of human rights abuses and of electoral fraud, following a turbulent presidential election.

2004 – Catalina affair: A Swedish DC-3 shot down by a Soviet MiG-15 in 1952 over the Baltic Sea is finally recovered after years of work.
  2004   – March 19 Shooting Incident: The Republic of China (Taiwan) president Chen Shui-bian is shot just before the country's presidential election on March 20.
2008 – GRB 080319B: A cosmic burst that is the farthest object visible to the naked eye is briefly observed.
2011 – Libyan Civil War: After the failure of Muammar Gaddafi's forces to take Benghazi, the French Air Force launches Opération Harmattan, beginning foreign military intervention in Libya.
2013 – A series of bombings and shootings kills at least 98 people and injures 240 others across Iraq.
2016 – Flydubai Flight 981 crashes while attempting to land at Rostov-on-Don international airport, killing all 62 on board.
  2016   – An explosion occurs in Taksim Square in Istanbul, Turkey, killing five people and injuring 36.

Births

Pre-1600
1206 – Güyük Khan, Mongol ruler, 3rd Great Khan of the Mongol Empire (d. 1248)
1434 – Ashikaga Yoshikatsu, Japanese shōgun (d. 1443)
1488 – Johannes Magnus, Swedish archbishop and theologian (d. 1544)
1534 – José de Anchieta, Spanish missionary and saint (d. 1597)
1542 – Jan Zamoyski, Polish nobleman (d. 1605)

1601–1900
1601 – Alonzo Cano, Spanish painter, sculptor, and architect (d. 1667)
1604 – John IV of Portugal (d. 1656)
1641 – Abd al-Ghani al-Nabulsi, Syrian author and scholar (d. 1731)
1661 – Francesco Gasparini, Italian composer and educator (d. 1727)
1684 – Jean Astruc, French physician and scholar (d. 1766)
1721 – Tobias Smollett, Scottish-Italian poet and author (d. 1771)  (baptised on this day)
1734 – Thomas McKean, American lawyer and politician, 2nd Governor of Pennsylvania (d. 1817)
1739 – Charles-François Lebrun, duc de Plaisance, French lawyer and politician (d. 1824)
1742 – Túpac Amaru II, Peruvian rebel leader (d. 1781)
1748 – Elias Hicks, American farmer, minister, and theologian (d. 1830)
1778 – Edward Pakenham, Anglo-Irish general and politician (d. 1815)
1809 – Fredrik Pacius, German composer and conductor (d. 1891)
1813 – David Livingstone, Scottish missionary and explorer (d. 1873)
1816 – Johannes Verhulst, Dutch composer and conductor (d. 1891)
1821 – Richard Francis Burton, English soldier, geographer, and diplomat (d. 1890)
1823 – Arthur Blyth, English-Australian politician, 9th Premier of South Australia (d. 1891)
1824 – William Allingham, Irish poet, author, and scholar (d. 1889)
1829 – Carl Frederik Tietgen, Danish businessman (d. 1901)
1844 – Minna Canth, Finnish journalist, playwright, and activist (d. 1897)
1847 – Albert Pinkham Ryder, American painter (d. 1917)
1848 – Wyatt Earp, American police officer (d. 1929)
1849 – Alfred von Tirpitz, German admiral and politician (d. 1930)
1858 – Kang Youwei, Chinese scholar and politician (d. 1927)
1860 – William Jennings Bryan, American lawyer and politician, 41st United States Secretary of State (d. 1925)
1861 – Lomer Gouin, Canadian lawyer and politician, Premier of Quebec (d. 1929)
1864 – Charles Marion Russell, American painter and sculptor (d. 1926)
1865 – William Morton Wheeler, American entomologist, myrmecologist, and academic (d. 1937)
1868 – Senda Berenson Abbott, Lithuanian-American basketball player and educator (d. 1954)
1871 – Schofield Haigh, English cricketer and coach (d. 1921)
1872 – Anna Held, Polish singer (d. 1918)
1873 – Max Reger, German pianist, composer, and conductor (d. 1916)
1875 – Zhang Zuolin, Chinese warlord (d. 1928)
1876 – Felix Jacoby, German philologist (d. 1959)
1880 – Ernestine Rose, American librarian and advocate (d. 1961) 
1881 – Edith Nourse Rogers, American social worker and politician (d. 1960)
1882 – Gaston Lachaise, French-American sculptor (d. 1935)
1883 – Norman Haworth, English chemist and academic, Nobel Prize laureate (d. 1950)
  1883   – Joseph Stilwell, American general (d. 1946)
1885 – Attik, Greek composer (d. 1944)
1888 – Josef Albers, German-American painter and educator (d. 1976)
  1888   – Léon Scieur, Belgian cyclist (d. 1969)
1891 – Earl Warren, American lieutenant, jurist, and politician, 14th Chief Justice of the United States (d. 1974)
1892 – Theodore Sizer, American professor of the history of art (d. 1967) 
  1892   – Ado Vabbe, Estonian painter (d. 1961)
  1892   – James Van Fleet, American general and diplomat (d. 1992)
1893 – Gertrud Dorka, German archaeologist, prehistorian and museum director (died 1976)
1894 – Moms Mabley, American comedian and singer (d. 1975)
1900 – Carmen Carbonell, Spanish stage and film actress (d. 1988)
  1900   – Frédéric Joliot-Curie, French physicist and academic, Nobel Prize laureate (d. 1958)

1901–present
1901 – Jo Mielziner, French-American set designer (d. 1976)
1904 – John Sirica, American lawyer and judge (d. 1992)
1905 – Joe Rollino, American weightlifter and boxer (d. 2010)
  1905   – Albert Speer, German architect and politician (d. 1981)
1906 – Adolf Eichmann, German SS officer (d. 1962)
  1906   – Clara Breed, American librarian and activist (d. 1994)
1909 – Louis Hayward, South African-born American actor (d. 1985)
  1909   – Marjorie Linklater, Scottish campaigner for the arts and environment of Orkney (d. 1997)
1910 – Joseph Carroll, American general (d. 1991)
1912 – Hugh Watt, Australian-New Zealand engineer and politician, Prime Minister of New Zealand (d. 1980)
1914 – Leonidas Alaoglu, Canadian-American mathematician and theorist (d. 1981)
  1914   – Jay Berwanger, American football player and coach (d. 2002)
1915 – Robert G. Cole, American colonel, Medal of Honor recipient (d. 1944)
  1915   – Patricia Morison, American actress and singer (d. 2018)
1916 – Eric Christmas, English-Canadian actor (d. 2000)
  1916   – Irving Wallace, American journalist, author, and screenwriter (d. 1990)
1917 – Laszlo Szabo, Hungarian chess player (d. 1998)
1919 – Lennie Tristano, American pianist, composer, and educator (d. 1978)
1920 – Kjell Aukrust, Norwegian author, poet, and painter (d. 2002)
1921 – Tommy Cooper, British magician and prop comedian (d. 1984)
1922 – Guy Lewis, American basketball player and coach (d. 2015)
  1922   – Hiroo Onoda, Japanese lieutenant (d. 2014)
1923 – Pamela Britton, American actress (d. 1974)
  1923   – Benito Jacovitti, Italian illustrator (d. 1997)
  1923   – Henry Morgentaler, Polish-Canadian physician and activist (d. 2013)
1924 – Joe Gaetjens, Haitian footballer (d. 1964)
1925 – Brent Scowcroft, American general and diplomat, 9th United States National Security Advisor (d. 2020)
1927 – Richie Ashburn, American baseball player and sportscaster (d. 1997)
1928 – Hans Küng, Swiss theologian and author (d. 2021)
  1928   – Patrick McGoohan, Irish-American actor, director, producer, and screenwriter (d. 2009)
1931 – Emma Andijewska, Ukrainian poet, writer and painter
1932 – Gay Brewer, American golfer (d. 2007)
  1932   – Peter Hall, English geographer, author, and academic (d. 2014)
  1932   – Gail Kobe, American actress and producer (d. 2013)
1933 – Phyllis Newman, American actress and singer (d. 2019)
  1933   – Philip Roth, American novelist (d. 2018)
  1933   – Renée Taylor, American actress, producer, and screenwriter
  1933   – Richard Williams, Canadian-English animator, director, and screenwriter (d. 2019)
1935 – Nancy Malone, American actress, director, and producer (d. 2014)
1936 – Ursula Andress, Swiss model and actress
  1936   – Ben Lexcen, Australian sailor and architect (d. 1988)
1937 – Clarence "Frogman" Henry, American R&B singer and pianist
  1937   – Egon Krenz, German politician
1938 – Joe Kapp, American football player, coach, and actor
1942 – Heather Robertson, Canadian journalist and author (d. 2014)
1943 – Mario J. Molina, Mexican chemist and academic, Nobel Prize laureate (d. 2020)
  1943   – Mario Monti, Italian economist and politician, Prime Minister of Italy
  1943   – Vern Schuppan, Australian race car driver
1944 – Said Musa, Belizean lawyer and politician, 5th Prime Minister of Belize
1945 – John Holder, English cricketer and umpire
  1945   – Modestas Paulauskas, Lithuanian basketball player and coach
1946 – Ruth Pointer, American musician
1947 – Glenn Close, American actress, singer, and producer
  1947   – Marinho Peres, Brazilian footballer and coach
1948 – David Schnitter, American saxophonist and educator
1949 – Blase J. Cupich, American theologian and cardinal
1950 – José S. Palma, Filipino archbishop
1952 – Warren Lees, New Zealand cricketer and coach
  1952   – Martin Ravallion, Australian economist and academic
  1952   – Harvey Weinstein, American director and producer
1953 – Ian Blair, English police officer
  1953   – Peter Hendy, English businessman
  1953   – Ricky Wilson, American singer-songwriter and musician (d. 1985) 
1954 – Cho Kwang-rae, South Korean footballer, coach, and manager
1955 – Bruce Willis, German-American actor and producer
1956 – Yegor Gaidar, Russian economist and politician, First Deputy Prime Minister of Russia (d. 2009)
1958 – Andy Reid, American football player and coach
1960 – Eliane Elias, Brazilian singer-songwriter and pianist
1962 – Iván Calderón, Puerto Rican-American baseball player (d. 2003)
1963 – Neil LaBute, American director and screenwriter
1964 – Yoko Kanno, Japanese pianist and composer
1966 – Michael Crockart, Scottish police officer and politician
  1966   – Olaf Marschall, German footballer and manager
  1966   – Andy Sinton, English international footballer and manager 
1967 – Vladimir Konstantinov, Russian-American ice hockey player
1968 – Tyrone Hill, American basketball player and coach
1970 – Harald Johnsen, Norwegian bassist and composer (d. 2011)
  1970   – Michael Krumm, German race car driver
1973 – Ashley Giles, English cricketer and coach
1975 – Antonio Daniels, American basketball player
1976 – Derek Chauvin, American criminal and former police officer
  1976   – Andre Miller, American basketball player
  1976   – Alessandro Nesta, Italian footballer and manager
1977 – David Ross, American baseball player and manager
1978 – Cydonie Mothersille, Jamaican-Caymanian sprinter
1979 – Sheldon Brown, American football player
  1979   – Ivan Ljubičić, Croatian tennis player
  1979   – Christos Patsatzoglou, Greek footballer
  1979   – Hedo Türkoğlu, Turkish basketball player
1980 – Luca Ferri, Italian footballer
  1980   – Taichi Ishikari, Japanese wrestler
  1980   – Mikuni Shimokawa, Japanese singer-songwriter 
1981 – Steve Cummings, English cyclist
  1981   – Kolo Touré, Ivorian footballer
1982 – Jonathan Fanene, American football player
  1982   – Brad Jones, Australian footballer
  1982   – Hana Kobayashi, Venezuelan singer
  1982   – Eduardo Saverin, Brazilian-Singaporean businessman
1985 – Inesa Jurevičiūtė, Lithuanian figure skater
1986 – Tyler Bozak, Canadian ice hockey player
1987 – AJ Lee, American wrestler and author
  1987   – Michal Švec, Czech footballer
  1987   – Miloš Teodosić, Serbian basketball player
1988 – Clayton Kershaw, American baseball player
1991 – Aleksandr Kokorin, Russian footballer
1993 – Hakim Ziyech, Moroccan footballer
1995 – Héctor Bellerín, Spanish footballer
  1995   – Julia Montes, Filipino actress
  1995   – Alexei Sintsov, Russian figure skater
1996 – Barbara Haas, Austrian tennis player
  1996   – Quenton Nelson, American football player

Deaths

Pre-1600
 235 – Severus Alexander, Roman emperor (b. 208)
 953 – al-Mansur bi-Nasr Allah, caliph of the Fatimid Caliphate (b. 913)
 968 – Emma of Paris, duchess of Normandy (b. 943)
1238 – Henry the Bearded, Polish duke and son of Bolesław I the Tall (b. 1163)
1263 – Hugh of Saint-Cher, French cardinal (b. 1200)
1279 – Zhao Bing, Chinese emperor (b. 1271)
1286 – Alexander III, king of Scotland (b. 1241)
1330 – Edmund of Woodstock, 1st Earl of Kent, English politician, Lord Warden of the Cinque Ports (b. 1301)
1372 – John II, marquess of Montferrat (b. 1321)
1533 – John Bourchier, 2nd Baron Berners, English baron and statesman (b. 1467)
1534 – Michael Weiße, German theologian (b. c. 1488)
1539 – Lord Edmund Howard, English nobleman (b. c. 1478)
1563 – Arthur Brooke, English poet
1568 – Elizabeth Seymour, Lady Cromwell, English noblewoman (b.c. 1518)
1581 – Francis I, duke of Saxe-Lauenburg (b. 1510)

1601–1900
1612 – Sophia Olelkovich Radziwill, Belarusian saint (b. 1585)
1637 – Péter Pázmány, Hungarian cardinal (b. 1570)
1649 – Gerhard Johann Vossius, German scholar and theologian (b. 1577)
1683 – Thomas Killigrew, English playwright and manager (b. 1612)
1687 – René-Robert Cavelier, Sieur de La Salle, French-American explorer (b. 1643)
1697 – Nicolaus Bruhns, German organist and composer (b. 1665)
1711 – Thomas Ken, English bishop and hymn-writer (b. 1637)
1717 – John Campbell, 1st Earl of Breadalbane and Holland, Scottish soldier (b. 1636)
1721 – Pope Clement XI (b. 1649)
1783 – Frederick Cornwallis, English archbishop (b. 1713)
1790 – Cezayirli Gazi Hasan Pasha, Ottoman general and politician, 182nd Grand Vizier of the Ottoman Empire (b. 1713)
1797 – Philip Hayes, English organist and composer (b. 1738)
1816 – Philip Mazzei, Italian-American physician and philosopher (b. 1730)
1871 – Wilhelm Karl Ritter von Haidinger, Austrian mineralogist, geologist, and physicist (b. 1795)
1884 – Elias Lönnrot, Finnish physician and philologist (b. 1802)
1897 – Antoine Thomson d'Abbadie, Irish-French geographer, ethnologist, linguist, and astronomer (b. 1810)
1900 – John Bingham, American lawyer and politician, 7th United States Ambassador to Japan (b. 1815)
  1900   – Charles-Louis Hanon, French pianist and composer (b. 1819)

1901–present
1914 – Giuseppe Mercalli, Italian priest, geologist, and volcanologist (b. 1850)
1919 – Emma Bell Miles, American writer, poet, and artist of Appalachia (b. 1879)
1930 – Arthur Balfour, Scottish-English politician, Prime Minister of the United Kingdom (b. 1848)
  1930   – Henry Lefroy, Australian politician, 11th Premier of Western Australia (b. 1854)
1942 – Clinton Hart Merriam, American zoologist, ornithologist, and entomologist (b. 1855)
1944 – William Hale Thompson, American rancher and politician, 41st Mayor of Chicago (b. 1869)
1947 – James A. Gilmore, American businessman and baseball executive (b. 1887)
1949 – James Somerville, English admiral and politician, Lord Lieutenant of Somerset (b. 1882)
  1949   – James Newland, Australian soldier and policeman (b. 1881)
1950 – Edgar Rice Burroughs, American soldier and author (b. 1875)
  1950   – Norman Haworth, English chemist and academic, Nobel Prize laureate (b. 1883)
1951 – Dmytro Doroshenko, Ukrainian historian and politician, Prime Minister of Ukraine (b. 1882)
1976 – Albert Dieudonné, French actor and author (b. 1889)
  1976   – Paul Kossoff, English guitarist and songwriter (b. 1950)
1977 – William L. Laurence, Lithuanian-born American journalist and author (b. 1888)
1978 – M. A. Ayyangar, Indian lawyer and politician, 2nd Speaker of the Lok Sabha (b. 1891)
1982 – J. B. Kripalani, Indian lawyer and politician (b. 1888)
  1982   – Randy Rhoads, American guitarist, songwriter, and producer (b. 1956)
1984 – Garry Winogrand, American photographer (b. 1928)
1986 – Sabino Barinaga, Spanish footballer and manager (b. 1922)
1987 – Louis de Broglie, French physicist and academic, Nobel Prize laureate (b. 1892)
1988 – Bun Cook, Canadian ice hockey player and coach (b. 1904)
1990 – Andrew Wood, American singer-songwriter (b. 1966)
1993 – Henrik Sandberg, Danish production manager and producer (b. 1915)
1996 – Lise Østergaard, Danish psychologist and politician (b. 1924)
  1996   – Alan Ridout, English composer and teacher. (b. 1934)
  1996   – Virginia Henderson, American nurse, researcher, theorist and author (b. 1897)
1997 – Willem de Kooning, Dutch-American painter and educator (b. 1904)
  1997   – Eugène Guillevic, French poet and author (b. 1907)
1998 – E. M. S. Namboodiripad, Indian theorist and politician, 1st Chief Minister of Kerala (b. 1909)
1999 – Tofilau Eti Alesana, Samoan politician, 5th Prime Minister of Samoa (b. 1924)
2000 – Joanne Weaver, American baseball player (b. 1935)
  2000   – Shafiq-ur-Rahman, Pakistani physician and author (b. 1920)
2003 – Michael Mathias Prechtl, German soldier and illustrator (b. 1926)
2004 – Mitchell Sharp, Canadian economist and politician, 23rd Canadian Minister of Finance (b. 1911)
2005 – John DeLorean, American engineer and businessman, founded the DeLorean Motor Company (b. 1925)
2008 – Arthur C. Clarke, English science fiction writer (b. 1917)
  2008   – Hugo Claus, Belgian author, poet, and playwright (b. 1929)
  2008   – Paul Scofield, English actor (b. 1922)
2009 – Maria Bergson, Austrian-American architect and interior designer (b. 1914)
2011 – Kym Bonython, Australian drummer and radio host (b. 1920)
2012 – Jim Case, American director and producer (b. 1927)
  2012   – Ulu Grosbard, Belgian-American director and producer (b. 1929)
  2012   – Hugo Munthe-Kaas, Norwegian intelligence agent (b. 1922)
2014 – Patrick Joseph McGovern, American businessman, founded IDG (b. 1937)
  2014   – Fred Phelps, American lawyer, pastor, and activist, founded the Westboro Baptist Church (b. 1929)
  2014   – Heather Robertson, Canadian journalist and author (b. 1942)
  2014   – Robert S. Strauss, American diplomat, United States Ambassador to Russia (b. 1918)
  2014   – Lawrence Walsh, Canadian-American lawyer, judge, and politician, 4th United States Deputy Attorney General (b. 1912)
  2014   – Joseph F. Weis, Jr., American lawyer and judge (b. 1923)
2015 – Gus Douglass, American farmer and politician (b. 1927)
  2015   – Safet Plakalo, Bosnian author and playwright (b. 1950)
  2015   – Danny Schechter, American director, producer, and screenwriter (b. 1942)
2016 – Roger Agnelli, Brazilian banker and businessman (b. 1959)
  2016   – Jack Mansell, English footballer and manager (b. 1927)
2019 – William Whitfield, British architect (b. 1920) 
2021 – Glynn Lunney, American engineer (b. 1936)

Holidays and observances
 Christian Observances:
 Alkmund of Derby
 Saint Joseph (Western Christianity; if this date falls on Sunday, the feast is moved to Monday March 20)
 Saint Joseph's Day (Roman Catholicism and Anglican Communion) related observances:
 Falles, celebrated on the week leading to March 19 (Valencia)
 Father's Day (Spain, Portugal, Italy, Honduras, and Bolivia)
 "Return of the Swallow", annual observance of the swallows' return to Mission San Juan Capistrano in California
 March 19 (Eastern Orthodox liturgics)
 Earliest day on which Maundy Thursday can fall, while April 22 is the latest; celebrated on Thursday before Easter (Christianity)
 Minna Canth's Birthday and the Day of Equality (Finland)
 Kashubian Unity Day (Poland)

References

External links

 BBC: On This Day
 
 Historical Events on March 19

Days of the year
March
Discordian holidays